Andrew Newport may refer to:

 Andrew Newport (Warden of the Mint), 14th century English courtier
 Andrew Newport (died 1611) (1563–1611), English MP
 Andrew Newport (1622–1699), English courtier and MP